In Love is the debut album by British Indie rock band Peace, released on 25 March 2013. The album was produced by Jim Abbiss.

Reception

The album has been met with generally positive reviews. NME gave In Love a 9 out of 10, with writer Eve Barlow claiming that the band are "as rejuvenating as a wash of zesty orange juice over a crushing hangover". The Independent gave the album 4 out of 5 stars, praising Koisser's "intriguing" songwriting that brought "an innovative eye to the age- old business of love through quirky images." Alexis Petridis of The Guardian was not as enthusiastic however, giving the album 2 out of 5 stars, but concluding "Whether there really is anything beyond that – or whether Peace's moment in the spotlight is as short-lived as that of the bands they bring to mind – remains to be seen."

Track listing

Personnel
Peace
Harrison Koisser – lead vocals, guitar
Samuel Koisser – bass guitar, backing vocals
Douglas Castle – lead guitar
Dominic Boyce – drums, backing vocals

Technical personnel
 Jim Abbiss – production

Charts

References

2013 debut albums
Peace (band) albums
Columbia Records albums